Tåsen is a station on the Sognsvann Line (line 5) of the Oslo Metro in Oslo, Norway. As one of the original stations on the line, Tåsen was opened on 10 October 1934. In 1992, a fatal accident occurred when a T1300 train collided with a snow plowing car ahead of the station.

The station is located near a bridge over the circumferential highway Ring 3 and the roundabout of the Tåsen road intersection. The area around Tåsen is mainly residential, and there is a small shopping centre named Tåsen senter near the station.

History
Tåsen station opened 10 October 1934, when Akersbanerne had built the line from Majorstuen to Sognsvann. The line was double-tracked from Majorstuen to Østhorn (then called Korsvoll), and single-tracked from there to Sognsvann. In 1939, the section Korsvoll–Sognsvann was upgraded to double track, and the station Korsvoll had its name changed to Østhorn.

Tåsen was part of Holmenkolbanen's network until 1973, when the municipality of Oslo bought all the company's stocks. In 1993, the stations were upgraded to metro standard, which involved a heightening and lengthening of the platforms, and installation of third rail power supply and a new signaling system.

Service
Tåsen is served by line 5 on the Sognsvann Line, operated by Oslo T-banedrift on contract with Ruter. The rapid transit serves the station every 15 minutes, except in the late evening and on weekend mornings, when there is a 30-minute headway. Travel time along the  portion to Stortinget in the city center is 13 minutes.

The station provides correspondence to the bus lines 34, 23 and 24 in two stops near the roundabout in Rolf Wickstrøms vei. The subsidiary of NOR-WAY Bussekspress, Flybussekspressen, provides a connection to Oslo Airport, Gardermoen from Tåsen.

Facilities
Tåsen has two platforms, each with a wooden shed. The sheds are drawn by Arne Henriksen in a minimalist and standardized style with constructions of wood and steel. The station is located in Tåsenveien, near Tåsen school, shortly after a bridge over the circumferential highway Norwegian National Road 150. There is an underpass that was constructed in the 1960s on the other side of the bridge, that allows pedestrian access to the Tåsen senter mall. Tåsen serves mainly the residential area Tåsen, but also Korsvoll and Nordberg.

References
Notes

Bibliography

External links

Metro stations in the west

Oslo Metro stations in Oslo
Railway stations opened in 1934
1934 establishments in Norway